Juan Alonso Aznar (born 30 July 1949) is a Spanish sailor. He competed in the Star event at the 1968 Summer Olympics.

References

External links
 

1949 births
Living people
Spanish male sailors (sport)
Olympic sailors of Spain
Sailors at the 1968 Summer Olympics – Star
Sportspeople from Bilbao
Sailors (sport) from the Basque Country (autonomous community)